The 1968–69 Primeira Divisão was the 35th season of top-tier football in Portugal.

Overview
It was contested by 14 teams, and S.L. Benfica won the championship.

League standings

Results

References

External links
 Portugal 1968-69 - RSSSF (Jorge Miguel Teixeira)
 Portuguese League 1968/69 - footballzz.co.uk
 Portugal - Table of Honor - Soccer Library

Primeira Liga seasons
1968–69 in Portuguese football
Portugal